Prints: Snapshots, Postcards, Messages and Miniatures, 1987–2001 is a 2002  album by English guitarist, composer and improvisor Fred Frith, and his first album of songs since Cheap at Half the Price (1983). It comprises four tracks taken from previously released compilations that Frith had contributed to between 1987 and 1997, seven tracks that were "created spontaneously" in the studio in 1997 and 2001, and one live guitar improvisation in 2001. The album was released on CD in 2002 on Fred Records and was the second release in Frith's archival release program on the record label.

Content

Compilation tracks
"Trains & Boats & Planes" and "The Ballad of Melody Nelson" are two cover songs Frith recorded for the Tzadik tribute CDs, Great Jewish Music: Burt Bacharach (1997) and Great Jewish Music: Serge Gainsbourg (1997) respectively. "The Ballad of Melody Nelson (La Ballade de Melody Nelson)" is about Gainsbourg's fictional character, Melody Nelson, and is sung by Frith in the original French. "Life of a Detective" was recorded with the 5uu's in 1990 and appeared on Place of General Happiness (1993). "True Love" was recorded in 1987 and was released on a Shimmy Disc compilation, The 20th Anniversary of the Summer of Love (1987) and then later included as one of the bonus tracks on the 1991 CD edition of Frith's solo album, Cheap at Half the Price.

Improvisations
The tracks "Stones", "Fingerprints", "Trocosi", "Levity",  "I Want it to be Over" and "In the Winter of '64" were recorded for a WDR radio production by Alexander Schuhmacher in January 1997. Frith explained how the pieces were created:

"Reduce Me" was recorded four years later using the same approach described above. "Spot" was a live guitar improvisation by Frith recorded in July 2001 where he used a live sampler to dynamically capture and loop guitar sounds.

Reception

In a review of Prints for AllMusic, François Couture described it as "a very fine album, ... truly enjoyable", and "much friendlier to the listener" than Frith's Cheap at Half the Price, which Couture in turn called "the best tongue-in-cheek take at the New Wave". He said Prints is "[h]ighly recommended", adding that the improviser's "humor and pop sensibility" contributes to its success.

In the MIT Press journal, Leonardo, Stefaan van Ryssen wrote that the recording process of Prints give the tracks an "immediacy and urgency". He described "Stones" as a waltz, "limping as if hit in the leg by a bullet", and "I Want it to be Over" as a "miniature drama" with improvisation that is "top class". Van Ryssen said the pieces are deceptively simple, but repeated listening reveals that the relationship between the samples and instruments is "subtle and never obvious", and they leave one "[in] awe at what a master improviser can do in real time".

Track listing
All tracks composed by Fred Frith excepted where noted.

Track notes
From Great Jewish Music: Burt Bacharach (1997, Tzadik)
Recorded at Jankowski Studio, Esslingen, Germany, 1996
Recorded at Jankowski Studio, Esslingen, Germany, January 1997
Text: International Herald Tribune, 27/01/97, "Palestinian independence celebrations in Hebron"
Sample: "Ligueyou Ndeye" by Doudou N'Diaye Rose
Recorded at Jankowski Studio, Esslingen, Germany, January 1997
From Place of General Happiness (1993, Modern Variety Music)
Recorded at Triple Helix, Denver, Colorado, 1990 (engineer: Bob Drake)
From Great Jewish Music: Serge Gainsbourg (1997, Tzadik)
Recorded at Jankowski Studio, Esslingen, Germany, 1997
Recorded at Jankowski Studio, Esslingen, Germany, January 1997
Text: International Herald Tribune, 28/01/97, "Enslavement of women in Ghana"
Sample: "Where Do You Want to Go" by Kahil El'Zabar
Recorded at Jankowski Studio, Esslingen, Germany, 2001
Text: The Guardian, July 2001, "Afghan woman returns home after ten years of exile"
Recorded at Jankowski Studio, Esslingen, Germany, January 1997
Sample: "Kattajait" from Inuit Games and Songs (UNESCO Collection)
Sample: applause for Helmut Kohl speech, Brandenburg Gate, Berlin
From The 20th Anniversary of the Summer of Love (1987, Shimmy Disc)
Recorded at Noise, New York City, 1987 (engineer: Mark Kramer)
Recorded at Jankowski Studio, Esslingen, Germany, January 1997
Text: International Herald Tribune, 27/01/97, "Bill Clinton interviewed about Monica Lewinsky"
Samples: Escher-loop, broken glass
Recorded at Jankowski Studio, Esslingen, Germany, July 2001
Recorded at Jankowski Studio, Esslingen, Germany, January 1997

Personnel
Fred Frith – all instruments (except those listed below), voice
Bernd "Lönsch" Lehmann (2,3) – clarinet, tenor saxophone
Mike Johnson (4) – principal voice
Dave Kerman (4) – backup voice
Sebastian Gramms (6) – acoustic bass
Alexandra Schulz (7) – additional voice
Sheena Dupuis (9) – backing vocal

Sound and artwork
Re-mixed, re-constructed and compiled at Jankowski Studio, Esslingen, Germany, by Peter Hardt and Fred Frith, July 2001
CD cover design by 
Polaroid photograph by Heike Liss

References

2002 albums
Fred Frith albums
Fred Records albums
Albums produced by Fred Frith